Unionville is an unincorporated community in Columbiana County, Ohio, United States.

Unionville was originally called Cool Springs, on account of there being a spring near the original town site.

References

Unincorporated communities in Columbiana County, Ohio
Unincorporated communities in Ohio